Michelle Menzies (born April 28, 1972 in Halifax, Nova Scotia) is a Canadian former pair skater. With partner Jean-Michel Bombardier, she won the gold medal at the Canadian Figure Skating Championships in 1995 and 1996.

Results

Pairs with Bombardier

Pairs with Wheeler

Fours with Wheeler and others

References

1972 births
Canadian female pair skaters
Living people
Sportspeople from Halifax, Nova Scotia
Competitors at the 1990 Goodwill Games